3RPH is a community radio station owned and operated by Vision Australia as part of the Vision Australia Radio network. The station broadcasts a radio reading service to Melbourne, Victoria, with repeater services in Warragul and Warrnambool, Victoria.

The station commenced broadcasting on 12 December 1982 at 1692 kHz AM, before moving to the 1179 kHz AM frequency vacated by 3KZ.

3RPH is also a member of Radio Print Handicapped Network and a BBC World Service partner station.

References

Radio stations in Melbourne
Radio reading services of Australia
Radio stations established in 1982
1982 establishments in Australia